Thryptomene longifolia is a species of flowering plant in the family Myrtaceae and is endemic to inland areas of South Australia. It is a shrub with more or less needle-shaped leaves and pink flowers with five to eight petals and five to eight stamens.

Description
The petals are also pink, elliptical, about the same length as the sepals and there are five to eight stamens. Flowering occurs around May.

Taxonomy
Thryptomene longifolia was first formally described in 1986 by John Green in the Flora of South Australia from specimens collected by T.R. Lothian near Tallaringa Well in 1967. The specific epithet (longifolia) means "long-leaved".

Distribution and habitat
This thryptomene grows on red sand dunes in the north of South Australia.

References

longifolia
Flora of South Australia
Plants described in 1986